Louis-André-Gabriel Bouchet (1759 – 7 July 1842) was a French historical painter and a pupil of Jacques-Louis David. He painted subjects from sacred and profane history, poetry, and portraits. He won the Prix de Rome in 1797, and continued to exhibit until 1819. Charles Gabet does not mention the date of his birth or death.

1807 he manufactured the portrait on behalf emperors Napoléon as counterpart to the work of Empress Joséphine who Robert Lefèvre 1805 had implemented. Napoléon gave these two portraits of the city Aachen to 1807. After their deportation of Aachen into the city lock of Berlin on order Friedrich Wilhelm IV copies were made before he sent the paintings back 1840 to Aachen. Probably Professor Carl Schmid painted the reproductions. The original works decorate today the entrance hall of Aachen city hall.

Works
 1797 Death of Marcus Porcius Cato the Younger
 Hector Isabey (1797–1814), sign., oil on canvas, 141 × 98 cm (55,5 × 38,6 in). 1994 auction.
 Eugenie Isabey (1803–1886), oil on canvas, 141 × 98 cm (55,5 × 38,6 in). 1994 auction.
 Alexandrine Isabey (1791–1871), Madame Charles Ciceri, sign., oil on canvas, 141 × 98 cm (55,5 × 38,6 in). 1994 auction.
 Mme. H and her children, 1815, oil on canvas, 165.4 × 122.6 cm (65 × 48 in). Eugene Fuller Memorial Collection, 62.75 Seattle Art Museum The Collection Holocaust Provenance.

Literature 
 J. Fey: „Zur Geschichte Aachener Maler des 19. Jahrhunderts.“ in: „Aus Aachens Vorzeit. Mit-teilungen des Vereins für Kunde der Aachener Vorzeit.“ Zehnter Jahrgang 1897, Nr. 4/8. S. 70–72. Kurzbiografie von Schmid. S.83f.
 "BOUCHET, Louis André Gabriel" in Bryan's Dictionary of Painters and Engravers by Michael Bryan, edited by Robert Edmund Graves and Sir Walter Armstrong, an 1889 publication now in the public domain.

External links 
 Portrait Napoleon I. in the city hall Aachen
 Works of Bouchet on artnet.de

References
 

18th-century French painters
French male painters
19th-century French painters
Prix de Rome for painting
Pupils of Jacques-Louis David
1759 births
1842 deaths
18th-century French male artists